Edmond Classen (16 May 1938 – 27 January 2014) was a Dutch actor. He appeared in 49 films and television shows between 1963 and 2012.

Selected filmography
 Come-Back! (1981)
 Ava & Gabriel: A Love Story (1990)
 Flodder 3 (1995)
 Lijmen/Het Been (2001)
 Black Out (2012)

References

External links

1938 births
2014 deaths
20th-century Dutch male actors
21st-century Dutch male actors
Dutch male film actors
Dutch male television actors
People from Arnhem